Cheirodes is a genus of darkling beetles in the Melanimini tribe. It was formerly known as Anemia until 1973, when T. J. Spilman determined Anemia to be a synonym of Cheirodes Géné, 1839.

Subgenera
Cheirodes is split into several subgenera:
 Cheirodes Géné, 1839
 Anemiadena Ardoin, 1971
 Histiaea Fairmaire, 1892
 Pseudanemia Wollaston, 1864
 Spinanemia Ardoin, 1971
 Trichanemia Ardoin, 1971

Ammidanemia Reitter, 1904 is partly synonymous with Histiaea Fairmaire, 1892 and Pseudanemia Wollaston, 1864.

Species
Among the species within this genus are:

 Subgenus Cheirodes Géné, 1839
 C. aethiopea (Ardoin, 1971) (Synonym: Anemia aethiopea Ardoin, 1971)
 C. chobauti (Reitter, 1898) (Synonyms: Anemia rotundicollis Reitter, 1884, Anemia reitteri Pic, 1899, Anemia chobauti (Reitter, 1898))
 C. durandi (Ardoin, 1971) (Synonym: Anemia durandi Ardoin, 1971)
 C. granulatus (Laporte, 1840) (Synonyms: Anemia crassa Wollaston, 1867, Anemia granulata Laporte, 1840)
 C. gruveli (Ardoin, 1971) (Synonym: Anemia gruveli Ardoin, 1971)
 C. humeralis (Ardoin, 1971) (Synonym: Anemia humeralis Ardoin, 1971)
 C. opacula (Fairmaire, 1882)
 C. punctata (Ardoin, 1971) (Synonym: Anemia punctata Ardoin, 1971)
 C. sardous Géné, 1839 (Synonym: Anemia sardoa (Géné, 1839))
 C. sardoa denticulata (Wollaston, 1867) (Synonym: Anemia sardoa sudanica Gridelli, 1950)
 C. villiersi (Ardoin, 1971) (Synonym: Anemia villiersi Ardoin, 1971)
 Subgenus Spinanemia Ardoin, 1971
 C. allardi (Ardoin, 1971) (Synonym: Anemia allardi Ardoin, 1971)
 C. amieti (Ardoin, 1971) (Synonym: Anemia amieti Ardoin, 1971)
 C. capensis (Ardoin, 1971) (Synonym: Anemia capensis Ardoin, 1971)
 C. cornutus (Pic, 1898) (Synonym: Anemia cornuta Pic, 1898)
 C. cornutus panelii (Ardoin, 1971) (Synonym: Anemia cornutus panelii Ardoin, 1971)
 C. crispa (Quedenfeldt, 1885) (Synonym: Anemia crispa Quedenfeldt, 1885)
 C. curta (Ardoin, 1971) (Synonym: Anemia curta Ardoin, 1971)
 C. hottentota (Ardoin, 1971) (Synonym: Anemia hottentota Ardoin, 1971)
 C. kaszabi (Ardoin, 1971) (Synonym: Anemia kaszabi Ardoin, 1971)
 C. mystacina (Ardoin, 1971) (Synonym: Anemia mystacina Ardoin, 1971)
 C. ovatula (Fairmaire, 1891)
 C. pilosus (Tournier, 1868) (Synonyms: Anemia pilosa Tournier, 1868, Anemia fenyesi Reitter, 1897, Cheirodes fissidens Reitter, 1898)
 C. poteli Lillig & Ferrer, 2001
 C. roeri (Ardoin, 1976)
 C. royi (Ardoin, 1971) (Synonym: Anemia royi Ardoin, 1971)
 C. royi tchadensis (Ardoin, 1971) (Synonym: Anemia royi tchadensis Ardoin, 1971)
 C. seriattipennis (Ardoin, 1971) (Synonym: Anemia seriattipennis Ardoin, 1971)
 C. thoracicus (Fairmaire, 1891) (Synonym: Anemia thoracicus Fairmaire, 1891)
 C. uhligi Ferrer, 2004
 Subgenus Anemiadena Ardoin, 1971
 C. convexa (Gestro, 1881)
 C. giraudini (Ardoin, 1971) (Synonym: Anemia giraudini Ardoin, 1971)
 Subgenus Trichanemia Ardoin, 1971
 C. schmitzi (Ardoin, 1971) (Synonym: Anemia schmitzi Ardoin, 1971)
 Subgenus Histiaea Fairmaire, 1892
 C. angolensis (Ardoin, 1971) (Synonym: Anemia angolensis Ardoin, 1971)
 C. asperulus (Reitter, 1884) (Synonyms: Anemia denticulata Pic, 1923, Anemia aegyptiaca Pic, 1936, Anemia asperula Reitter, 1884, Anemia asperula var. seriesetosa Baudi, 1884)
 C. bidentulus (Fairmaire, 1892) (Synonym: Histiaea bidentula Ardoin, 1971)
 C. jaegeri Bremer, 2001
 C. kochii (Ardoin, 1976)
 C. sakalava (Alluaud, 1900)
 C. schultzei (Geibien, 1910) (Synonym: A. submetallica Peringuey, 1908)
 Subgenus Pseudanemia Wollaston, 1864
 C. abyssinica (Ardoin, 1971) (Synonym: Anemia abyssinica Ardoin, 1971)
 C. brevicollis (Wollaston, 1864) (Synonyms: Anemia aphodioides Walker, 1871, Anemia rotundicollis Desbrochers, 1881, Anemia fausti Solsky, 1881, Anemia hauseri Reitter, 1894, Anemia striolata Fairmaire, 1894, Anemia pharao Reitter, 1897, Anemia curticollis Pic, 1923, Pseudanemia brevicollis Wollaston, 1864)
 C. drurei (Pic, 1923) (Synonym: Anemia drurei Pic, 1923)
 C. submetallicus (Raffray, 1873) (Synonyms: Anemia palaestina Pic, 1899, Anemia submetallica (Raffray, 1873), Anoemia submetallica Raffray, 1873)
 C. africanus Ferrer, 2016
 C. ahomanae Ferrer, 2016
 C. anatolicus Ferrer, 2016
 C. arabicus Ferrer, 2016
 C. californicus (Horn, 1870) (Synonym: Anaemia californica Horn, 1870)
 C. dentipes (Ballion, 1878) (Synonym: Microzoum dentipes Ballion, 1878)
 C. guanchorum Ferrer, 2016
 C. linnmani Ferrer, 2016
 C. massauensis Ferrer, 2016
 C. occulata (Wollaston, 1860)
 C. otomanus Ferrer, 2016
 C. ruthmuellerae Ferrer, 2016
 C. sculpturata (Ritsema, 1875)

References

External links
 Fauna Europaea: Genus Anemia
 

Tenebrioninae
Tenebrionidae genera
Beetles of Europe